Ildikó Pusztai (born 11 November 1964) is a Hungarian fencer. She competed in the women's team foil event at the 1992 Summer Olympics.

References

External links
 

1964 births
Living people
Hungarian female foil fencers
Olympic fencers of Hungary
Fencers at the 1992 Summer Olympics
People from Szolnok
Sportspeople from Jász-Nagykun-Szolnok County
20th-century Hungarian women